Socialist Democrat Party (in Spanish: Partido Demócrata Socialista) was a political party in Peru that was founded in 1944. Its president was Luis A. Suárez, internal secretary Manuel Sánchez Palacios and organizational secretary G. Carrión Matos.

Defunct political parties in Peru
Political parties established in 1944
1944 establishments in Peru
Socialist parties in Peru
Political parties with year of disestablishment missing